The Parti de la démocratie socialiste (PDS) ran ninety-seven candidates in the 1998 Quebec provincial election, none of whom were elected. Information about these candidates may be found on this page.

Candidates
(n.c.: no candidate)

References

1998